The Macchi M.17 was an Italian racing flying boat built by Macchi for the 1922 Schneider Trophy race.

Design and development
The M.17 was the first purpose-built racing seaplane that Macchi company designer Alessandro Tonini designed. It was a single-seat flying boat powered by a 186-kilowatt (250-horsepower) Isotta Fraschini V.6 engine mounted on the upper wing on N struts and driving a two-bladed propeller in a pusher configuration.

Operational history
Macchi built two M.17 aircraft, one of which (I-BAHG) took third place in the 1922 Schneider Trophy race with Arturo Zanetti at the controls. It posted an average speed of 225 kilometers per hour (140 miles per hour).

The other M.17, I-BAFV flown by Piero Corgnolino, placed fourth.

Operators

Regia Marina

Specifications

See also

Notes

References

El Trofeo Schneider (Aviones de carreras) (Spanish)
LetLetLet Warplanes: The Schneider Trophy racers

1920s Italian sport aircraft
M.17
Flying boats
Schneider Trophy
Biplanes
Single-engined pusher aircraft
Aircraft first flown in 1922